Graham Bond (1937–1974) was an English musician in the band "The Graham Bond Organisation"

Graham, Graeme or Grahame Bond may also refer to:

 Graham Bond (footballer) (1932–1998), English former footballer
 Graeme Bond (born 1949), Australian rules footballer and radio commentator
 Graham Bond (gymnast) (1937–2018), Australian Olympic gymnast
 Grahame Bond (born 1943), Australian actor, writer, director, musician and composer, known primarily for his role as Aunty Jack.